Wilda C. Gafney, also known as Wil Gafney, (born 1966) is an American biblical scholar and Episcopal priest who is the Right Rev. Sam B. Hulsey Professor of Hebrew Bible at Brite Divinity School  of Texas Christian University in Fort Worth, Texas. She is specialist in womanist biblical interpretation, and topics including gender and race.

Early life and education
Gafney's parents were both teachers, who divorced when she was young. She grew up attending a non-denominational church, was baptized in an AME Church, and attended a Catholic high school.

Gafney earned a BA from Earlham College, a Quaker institution, in 1987, where she was one of only seven Black students on a campus of over 1000 students. She completed a Master's of Divinity from Howard University, an historically black college, in 1997. She completed a PhD in Hebrew Bible from Duke University in 2006, where she was mentored by Roland E. Murphy. Her doctoral dissertation became her first book, Daughters of Miriam, a study of female prophets in ancient Israel.

Career
Gafney is an Episcopal priest, licensed in the Diocese of Fort Worth and formerly resident in the Diocese of Pennsylvania. She was a US Army Reserve chaplain and a congregational pastor in the AME Zion Church, as well as a member of Germantown Jewish Center, Reconstructionist Jewish congregation in Philadelphia.

Gafney's first teaching position was at the Lutheran Seminaries in Philadelphia and Gettysburg, beginning in 2003. In 2014, she was appointed Associate Professor of Hebrew Bible at Brite Divinity School at Texas Christian University. In 2018, she served on a committee that recommended The Book of Common Prayer for the Episcopal Church in the United States be changed to gender neutral language.

Gafney's research focuses on intersections between the biblical text and contemporary issues, and she has taught courses called "The Bible and Black Lives Matter", "Exodus in African American Exegesis", and "The Bible in the Public Square". She is on the editorial team for the Journal of Biblical Literature. Her book Womanist Midrash uses womanist and feminist hermeneutics to interpret passages from the Hebrew Scriptures.

From 2012 to 2013, Gafney wrote a series of articles for the Huffington Post on topics including sexual violence and civil rights. In June 2018, in response to Jeff Sessions quoting Romans 13 to defend President Donald Trump's policy of separating children from their parents at the border, Gafney wrote an article for Religion Dispatches titled "If We Did Use the Bible to Run the Country…." In September 2020, Gafney participated in "Scholar Strike", an initiative inspired by the strikes by athletes to call attention to racial injustice in the US. Gafney posted a video to the Scholar Strike YouTube page titled "White Supremacy in Biblical Interpretation." After many journalists called January 6, 2021, a "dark day", Gafney responded, "Today was not a 'dark day'. Today was a white day. One of the whitest days in American history."

Awards and honors
In 2019, the Union of Black Episcopalians presented Gafney with the Anna Julia Haywood Cooper Honor Award for her scholarship and advocacy on matters of race and gender. In 2020, the Society of Biblical Literature named her one of the first two recipients of its Outstanding Mentor Award.

Selected publications

Books

Chapters and articles

References

External links
  (The Rev. Wil Gafney, Ph.D.)
 

Living people
1966 births
Earlham College alumni
Howard University alumni
Duke University alumni
American Episcopal priests
African Methodist Episcopal Church clergy
Texas Christian University faculty
21st-century biblical scholars
American biblical scholars
African-American biblical scholars
Female biblical scholars
Feminist biblical scholars
Womanist theologians